The New South Wales Minister for Agriculture is responsible for the administration and development of agriculture, fisheries, aquaculture, state forests, biosecurity, and crown lands in New South Wales, Australia.

The current minister, who also serves as the Minister for Western New South Wales, is Dugald Saunders, since 21 December 2021. The minister administers the portfolio through the Regional NSW cluster, including the Department of Regional NSW and a range of other government agencies such as the Department of Primary Industries.

Ultimately the minister is responsible to the Parliament of New South Wales.

List of ministers

Agriculture
The following individuals have served as Minister for Agriculture, or any precedent titles:

Former ministerial titles

Fisheries

Natural resources

Forests

Rural affairs

See also 

List of New South Wales government agencies

References

External links
 NSW Department of planning and Industry)

Agriculture
New South Wales